Fred Arbinger (born 6 June 1957) is a former German footballer.

Arbinger was born in Aldersbach.  He began his career playing amateur football in his native Bavaria, before being signed by FC Bayern Munich in 1976. He mad the misfortune to make his debut in Bayern's record league defeat, a 7–0 home loss against FC Schalke 04. He made nine more appearances in his first season, most notably a substitute appearance in the second leg of the Intercontinental Cup. He didn't play at all the following season, though, and left for Tennis Borussia Berlin in 1978. After two seasons in Berlin he returned to the Bavarian amateur leagues, initially as a player and later as a coach. He served as a youth coach with SV Wacker Burghausen from 2003 to 2007, and had a brief spell as the club's caretaker manager.

Honours 
 Intercontinental Cup: 1976

References

External links 
 

1957 births
Living people
People from Passau (district)
Sportspeople from Lower Bavaria
German footballers
Bundesliga players
2. Bundesliga players
Association football midfielders
FC Bayern Munich footballers
FC Bayern Munich II players
Tennis Borussia Berlin players
German football managers
Footballers from Bavaria